Wing Hin Motorsports is a Malaysian auto racing team based in Kuala Lumpur, Malaysia. The team currently races in the TCR Asia Series and Malaysian Super Series.

TCR Asia Series

SEAT León Cup Racer (2015–)
The team will enter the 2015 TCR Asia Series season with Kenny Lee driving a SEAT León Cup Racer.

External links
 Wing Hin Motorsports official website

References

Malaysian auto racing teams
TCR Asia Series teams

Auto racing teams established in 2001